Ušte is a former settlement in the Municipality of Moravče in central Slovenia. It is now part of the village of Dešen. The area is part of the traditional region of Upper Carniola. The municipality is now included in the Central Slovenia Statistical Region.

Geography
Ušte lies in the northwestern part the village of Dešen, below the west slope of Ribič Hill.

History
Ušte had a population of six living in one house in 1900. Ušte was annexed by Dešen in 1952, ending its existence as an independent settlement.

References

External links

Ušte on Geopedia

Populated places in the Municipality of Moravče
Former settlements in Slovenia